William Henry O’Malley Wood (15 June 1856 – 5 August 1941) was an Australian banker, public servant and surveyor. Wood was born in Grenfell, New South Wales and died in Vaucluse, Sydney, New South Wales. Wood served two terms as the President of the Government Savings Bank of New South Wales (1920–1928; 1931–1933) and was the first President of the Rural Bank of New South Wales (1933–1934). For his public service, Wood was awarded the King George V Silver Jubilee Medal in 1935.

References

Australian bankers
Australian public servants
Australian surveyors
Australian Anglicans
1856 births
1941 deaths
Australian chairpersons of corporations
Australian corporate directors
Australian chief executives
State Bank of New South Wales